Ambia xantholeuca is a moth in the family Crambidae first described by George Hampson in 1896. It is found in Sri Lanka.

Description
The wingspan is about 14 mm. Female whitish. Head, thorax and abdomen with orange marks. Forewing with orange bands. A discocellular orange patch is visible, with an oblique line from it to costa and small triangular spot on costa. Some black irroration (speckles) can be found beyond the discocellular patch. Hindwings also possess orange band with a black-edged orange medial band. Costa with some black color which is spread toward inner area.

References

Moths described in 1896
Musotiminae
Moths of Sri Lanka